Michael Haydn's Symphony No. 12 in G major, Perger 7, Sherman 12, MH 108, written in Salzburg in 1768, was at one time mistaken for a symphony by Joseph Haydn (Hob. I:G8).

Scored for 2 oboes, 2 bassoons, 2 horns and strings, in four movements:

Allegro molto
Andante, in C major
Menuetto e Trio
Prestissimo

Discography

Included in a set of 20 symphonies on the CPO label with Bohdan Warchal conducting the Slovak Philharmonic. It has also appeared on LP, recorded by the Camerata Academica Salzburg, and by the RIAS-Sinfonietta Berlin.

Notes

References
 A. Delarte, "A Quick Overview Of The Instrumental Music Of Michael Haydn" Bob's Poetry Magazine November 2006: 18 PDF
 Charles H. Sherman and T. Donley Thomas, Johann Michael Haydn (1737–1806), a chronological thematic catalogue of his works. Stuyvesant, New York: Pendragon Press (1993)
 C. Sherman, "Johann Michael Haydn" in The Symphony: Salzburg, Part 2 London: Garland Publishing (1982): lxv

Symphony 12
1768 compositions
Compositions in G major